The Temernik (also Temernichka ) is a small river in Rostov Oblast of Russia. It is a right tributary of the Don, and is 33 km long, with a drainage basin of 293 km². Temernik is very polluted.

References 

Rivers of Rostov Oblast